5 Sundarikal is a Malayalam romantic anthology film. It contains five short stories on love about five types of women. The stories are directed by Shyju Khalid, Sameer Thahir, Aashiq Abu, Amal Neerad and Anwar Rasheed, and feature an ensemble cast. The film was produced by Amal Neerad Productions. The music directors were Gopi Sundar, Bijibal, Prashant Pillai and Yakzan Gary Pereira. The film reached theatres on 21 June. A promo song by popular Kochi-based rock band Black Letters was also released.

The featurette Sethulakshmi is an adaptation of M. Mukundan's short story "Photo" while Kullande Bharya is based on a Chinese story, "The Tall Woman and Her Short Husband", by Feng Jicai. It is narrated by Dulquer Salmaan.

List of short films

Plots

Sethulakshmi 
Sethulakshmi (Baby Anikha), a schoolgirl, collects the photos of newly married couples from newspapers and pastes them in a notebook. Her close friend (Chethan Jayalal) learns about her interest in photography. They decide to go to a studio nearby for taking their photos. This decision changes their destiny. They go to the photo studio and have their picture taken only to find out that it will cost them Rs. 25. They are asked to bring the money in two days. They come up with only Rs. 6.50 and two eggs (the two eggs brought by Sethulakshmi's close friend). The studio owner tells them that he will go to their school and get the balance from their teacher. Both the children state that it is a bad idea. This sends the studio owner into a rage demanding his money. After a moment he calms down and asks Sethulakshmi to come into the film room to take a picture. While there he asks her to strip; she cries wanting to go home. Sethulakshmi has nightmares of that incident that night but does not disclose anything to her parents. She is taken to school by her father the next day as she exhibits feverish conditions. After school as Sethulakshmi and her friend walk home, they see the scooter that belongs to the studio owner. He hands the picture to Sethulaksmi's friend but pulls Sethulakshmi aside and threatens her that he would put her picture on the school wall if she does not immediately accompany him. Sethulakhsmi's friend demands to know where the studio owner is taking Sethulakshmi to, but the studio owner tells him to go home. Sethulaskhmi's friend is left alone as he watches the studio owner and Sethulakskmi leave on his scooter.

Isha 
This episode of love opens up with a husband and wife preparing to leave for a party on New Year's Eve. While the father is nonchalant about it, the mother is concerned about leaving their daughter Theresa (Isha Sharvani) at home. She is concerned about her safety and her shenanigans. After the couple leave, the daughter soon becomes aware of someone inside the house. By then it is too late as she wakes up tied to a chair in her house. She then notices that the thief has on a mask and after a few attempts at trying to free herself, the thief asks her to quiet down. After Theresa continues to struggle, it is revealed that she has an Asthma issue and asks the thief to get her the inhaler which is in her bag. While getting the inhaler the thief (Nivin Pauly) inadvertently removes his mask. He threatens her to be quiet after she asks to be untied. As the thief begins to search drawers, Isha lets him know in which drawers the house valuables are. After taking all the jewels in the house, the thief is set to leave when Theresa proposes an idea. She tells the thief that if he were to spend New Year's Eve with her at home she would show him more of the expensive stuff in the house (it is revealed here that Theresa's mother is really her step-mother and she harbors resentment against her step-mother). So the thief releases Theresa. While Theresa is excited about this stealing adventure, the thief is only interested in expensive things. As the night moves on, Theresa gets very comfortable with the thief, even seducing him. They celebrate the New Year on the terrace with some intimate moments. At this point, it is obvious that the thief is drunk from the vine that belonged to Theresa's father and Theresa uses this to her advantage and ties the thief to the very chair she was tied to. The true suspense is revealed to the audience after this as she is not the actual daughter. She is Isha, another thief who came before Nivin and tied up the actual daughter.

Gauri 
The short film tells the love story of a married couple living in a hill station. After materializing their love affair through a registered marriage, Gauri (Kavya Madhavan) and Jonathan Antony (Biju Menon) choose the place to begin their married life. Jo is crazy about trekking while Gauri is a dancer and teaches art to her students. On their anniversary, Jo leaves the home before sunrise and goes for trekking. Gauri wakes up hours later to find a note on their bedside table which seems to be a fun scavenger hunt set by Jo to get rid of her boredom. She sets out to find the clues while doing her daily routine. As soon as she finds the third note, Jo's guide knocks on the door and lets her know that Jo had fallen from a cliff. Gauri is devastated and is in denial of Jo's death. Years later, A man comes looking at the same property and he learns that Gauri had killed herself that night and the bungalow has been empty ever since.

Kullante Bharya 
A newlywed couple comes to stay in an apartment. The husband played by Jinu Ben who is only 5 feet 1 inches is shorter than his extremely tall wife played by the 6 feet tall young newcomer Reenu Mathews. The colony neighbors begin to gossip about them. As the couple lives happily, they expect their baby to add to the joy. But destiny has something else in store for them. The whole film is pictured from the point of view of a person who is bed-ridden after an accident (played by Dulquer Salmaan). It is reminiscent of the photographer in wheelchair observing his neighbors in Alfred Hitchcock's Rear Window.

Aami 
A businessman, Ajmal (Fahadh Faasil), faces a row of events during his journey from Malappuram to Kochi. His affectionate wife (Asmita Sood) tries to keep him awake during the drive by asking a few tricky questions. The nocturnal journey becomes eventful and changes the course of his life.

Cast

Sethulakshmi 
 Anikha Surendran as Sethulakshmi
 Chethan Jayalal as Abhilash
 Guru Somasundaram as Photographer
 Gopalakrishnan as Achan
 Anjali Nair as Amma
 Unnimaya Prasad as Teacher
 Baby Aavani as sister

Isha 
 Isha Sharvani as Theresa 
 Nivin Pauly as Jinu/Santa
 Deepak Sharaf as Teresa's father
 Sujatha as Teresa's mother
 Pradeep Kottayam as Police Constable

Gauri 
 Kavya Madhavan as Gauri
 Biju Menon as Jonathan Antony
 Shine Tom Chacko as Servant
 Tini Tom
 Rimi Tomy
 Jayasurya as buyer

Kullante Bharya 
 Reenu Mathews as Kullante Bharya
 Jinu Ben as Kullan
 Dulquer Salman as Injured stuntman
 Dileesh Pothen as Security
 Soubin Shahir
 Muthumani as Sicily
 Pauly Valsan as Molly Chechi
 Mano Jose as Sugunan
 Shirly Somasundaran as Annamma Chacko
 Jayaraj as Chacko Mash
 Sankar T. K. as Sicily's husband
 Ajith Vijayan as Ambiswamy
 Shanthi Sunil as Ambiswamy's wife
 Karan Rahul as Schoolboy

Aami 
 Asmita Sood as Aami
 Fahadh Faasil as Ajmal
 Honey Rose as Nancy
 Chemban Vinod Jose as Joshy
 Vinayakan as Chandran

Production
The first film Sethulakshmi was by cinematographer Shyju, debuting as a director. The film was an adaptation of the story "Photo" by M. Mukundan. Two child artists, Baby Anikha and Chethan, played the lead in his segment. Tamil theatre actor Somasundaram, who acted in Aaranya Kaandam, was signed to play a photographer in the film, setting foot into Malayalam films.

Sameer Thahir cast Isha Sharvani opposite Nivin Pauly in his segment. Isha, who made her Malayalam debut with this film, said that Sameer's story - written by Sijoy Varghese - explores the love between two strangers. This segment was completed in January 2013.

Aashiq Abu's featurette Gauri (earlier titled Naayika) is period film about a group of people going in search of a promised land. Biju Menon and Kavya Madhavan were signed to play the lead. Singer Rimi Tomy stated that she would be acting opposite Tini Tom, making her acting debut. In March 2013, Jayasurya was also signed up for a role. The shoot of the portion was held in Munnar and other locales.

Amal Neerad cast Dulquer Salmaan and Reenu Mathews, who acted in Lal Jose's Immanuel, as the lead pair for his portion. Debutante Jinu Ben was given a prominent role. Neerad said that the story was loosely based on an ancient Chinese short story, "The Tall Woman and Her Short Husband".

Fahadh Faasil stated that he and Rima Kallingal would pair up in Anwar Rasheed's segment of the anthology. Rima Kallingal was replaced, and Honey Rose and Asmita Sood play the lead female roles in this film. Anwar said that the story unfolds on an eventful night and can be called a road movie.

The directors pitched in for each other as well. Anwar Rasheed's portion was filmed by Amal Neerad, Shyju Kahlid handled the camera of Sameer Thahir's film, Aashiq Abu's film was shot by Rajeev Ravi and Amal Neerad chose his assistant Ranadive to operate the camera.

Soundtrack

Awards 
 Kerala State Film Award for Best Child Artist - Anikha Surendran

References

External links
 
 "An English translation of M. Mukundan's Photo" (appeared in Malayalam Fiction Special edition of Guftugu)
 Five star experiment (The Hindu)
 Stories from the heart (The New Indian Express)
 Review (Malayala Manorama)
 Review (Sify.com)
 Review (Rediff.com)
 Review (Nowrunning.com)

2013 films
Films directed by Aashiq Abu
Indian anthology films
2010s Malayalam-language films
2013 romance films
Indian romance films
Films shot in Munnar
Films scored by Gopi Sundar
Films directed by Amal Neerad
Films directed by Anwar Rasheed
Films directed by Sameer Thahir